General elections were held in Barbados on 26 January 1942. The result was a victory for the Barbados Electors Association, which won 15 of the 24 seats in the House of Assembly.

Results

References

Barbados
1942 in Barbados
Elections in Barbados
Election and referendum articles with incomplete results
January 1942 events